is a Japanese actor.

Career
Sugata was born in Yamanashi Prefecture.  He starred in the 2006 film Confessions of a Dog.

He appeared in Amir Naderi's 2011 film Cut.

Filmography

Film

 Seiha (1982) as Nakahara
 Kita no hotaru (1984)
 Abunai Deka (1987)
 Korogashi Ryota: Gekitotsu! Monster bus (1988) as Hyodo
 Baka Yaro! 2: Shiawase ni Naritai (1989)
 Water Moon (1989) as Kuribayashi
 Fûsen (1990) as Hayato Yoshioka
 Shishiohtachi no natsu (1991)
 Dance Till Tomorrow (1991)
 Blowback 2 (1991) as Ratts
 Funky Monkey Teacher 2 (1992) as Sugimoto
 Funky Monkey 2 (1992)
 Anego - Gokudô wo aishita onna: Kiriko (1993) as Jin
 Toei Hero Daishugo (1994)
 Escape Imprisonment 5: Obscene Flesh Hunt (1995)
 Shabu gokudo (1996) as Ryo Kano
 Organ (1996) as Naka Nishi
 Ikasetai onna (1996)
 Heat After Dark (1996)
 Kawaki no machi (1997)
 Fukushu the Revenge Kienai Kizuato (1997) as Toshiaki Yoshioka
 Koi to Hanabi to Kanransha (1997)
 Kumo no hitomi (1998) as Hinuma
 Joker (1998) as Kurokawa
 Shura ga Yuku (1998)
 Yomigaeru Kintarou (1998)
 License to Live (1998) as Shinichirô Yoshii
 Blood (1998) as Sniper Team Captain
 Shin karajishi kabushiki kaisha (1999)
 Ley Lines (1999) as Cop
 Kyôhan (1999) as Tadokoro
 Taboo (1999)
 Tomie: Replay (2000) as Kenzo Morita
 Kurayami no rekuiemu (2000) as Kumicho (Head of yakuza)
 Pulse (2001) as Boss
 Ichi the Killer (2001) as Takayama
 Momantai 2 (2002) as Kazuo Ota
 Graveyard of Honor (2002) as Toshi Nishizaki
 Gun Crazy (2002)
 Alive (2002) as Matsuda
 Kyoki no Sakura (2002)
 Buyûden (2003)
 Kill Bill: Volume 1 (2003) as Boss Benta
 The Last Samurai (2003) as Nakao
 Heat (2004, part 1, 2) as Fujimaki
 Kill Bill: Volume 2 (2004) as Boss Benta
 Marebito (2004) as MIB
 Izo (2004)
 [Is A.] (2004) as Mamoru Hanamura
 Tsukineko ni mitsu no tama (2004) as Oiwake
 Satsujin Net (2004)
 Lady Joker (2004) as Detective Anzai
 Ghost Shout (2004)
 Gokudou no Onna Tachi (2005)
 TKO Hip Hop (2005)
 Ikusa (2005)
 Onaji tsuki wo miteiru (2005)
 Shisso (2005) as Shuji's Father
 Aishiteyo (2005)
 Confessions of a Dog (2006) as Takeda
 Koi suru inosento man (2006)
 Dororo (2007) as Hibukuro
 Tonari Machi Sensou (2007) as Mayor of Maisaka
 Kôan keisatsu sôsakan (2007)
 Zero Woman (2007)
 Konjaku monogatari: The new edition (2007)
 Glory to the Filmmaker! (2007)
 Tôchika (2007)
 Grow (2007) as Tetsuharu Sato
 Captain (2007)
 Namida tsubo (2008) as Shugo
 Dâku rabu: Rape (2008)
 Chikyû de tatta futari (2008)
 Sekai de ichiban utsukushii yoru (2008) as Hara
 Tokyo Gore Police (2008) as TOKYO POLICE Commissioner General
 Sakigake!! Otokojuku (2008)
 Johnen: Sada no ai (2008)
 Kyûka (2008) as Fumio Sakamoto
 Chameleon (2008)
 Inju: The Beast in the Shadow (2008) as Inspecteur Fuji
 Zen (2009) as Kônin
 Yôjû mameshiba (2009)
 Kanikôsen (2009) as Field Officer
 Hakujitsumu (2009)
 Ballad: Na mo naki koi no uta (2009) as Assistant Professor Yi
 Wangan Midnight The Movie  (2009) as Kuro
 The Unbroken (2009) as Tatsuro Shikata
 Abashiri ikka: The Movie (2009)
 Tochka (2009)
 Ranningu on enputi (2010) as Hideji's Father
 Lost & Found (2010)
 Rosuto kuraimu: Senkô (2010) as Bunpei Shishikura
 Awaremi mumashika (2010) as Nishimura Katsuhiko
 Bunraku (2010) as Uncle
 Hevunzu sutôrî (2010)
 Strangers in the City (2010) as Yukio Ohmori
 Heaven's Story (2010)
 Kill Bill: The Whole Bloody Affair (2011) as Boss Benta
 Abe Sada: Saigo no nanokakan (2011) as Officer Urakawa
 Cut (2011) as Masaki
 Dirty Hearts (2011) as Sasaki
 Donzumari benki (2012) as Aoki
 Playback (2012)
 Outrage Beyond (2012) as Okamoto
 Haha no uta ga kikoeru (2013)
 Ninja: Shadow of a Tear (2013) as Goro
 Tokyo Bitch, I Love You (2013)
 Heisei Riders vs. Shōwa Riders: Kamen Rider Taisen feat. Super Sentai (2014) as Ryo Murasame / Kamen Rider ZX / Ambassador Darkness
 Washi to taka (2014)
 Genge (2014)
 25 (2014)
 Bad Moon Rising (2015)
 Zutaboro (2015)
 Gonin Saga (2015) as Yuzuru Matsuura
 64: Part I (2016) as Police Station Chief Urushibara
 Conflict: Saidai no kôsô (2016) as Otani
 64: Part II (2016) as Head of Precinct,Urushibara
 Taiyô no futa (2016)
 Tatara Samurai (2016)
 Silence (2016) as Samurai Commander
 Butterfly Sleep (2017) as Ayamine Ryuji
 Vigilante (2017)
 Roupeiro no Yūutsu (2018) as Prison Warden
 Black Crow 1 (2019) as Kanai
 Black Crow 2 (2019) as Kanai
 A Family (2021) as Makoto Takeda
 The Supporting Actors: The Movie (2021) as Himself
 Tomorrow's Dinner Table (2021) as Tsuneo Fujisaki
 Just Remembering (2022)
 The Setting Sun (2022)

Television
 Birth of the 10th! Kamen Riders All Together!! (1984, TV Movie) as Ryo Murasame / Kamen Rider ZX
 Kekko Kamen 3 (1993, Video)
 Tokusou Robo Janperson (1993-1994) as Ryuzaburou Tatewaki / Bill Goldy
 Juukou B-Fighter (1995-1996)
 Be-Bop High School (1996-1998) as Ryuzaburou Tatewaki
 Shizuka naru Don (1997)
 Nanbakinyuuden Minami no Teio (1998)
 Ore no Sora (1998)
 Engine Sentai Go-onger (2008) as Gang Father
 Tenchijin (2009) as Shibata Katsuie
 Fuller House as "The Dragon" (episode: "My Best Friend's Japanese Wedding")
 Ishitsubute (2017)
 The Supporting Actors 2 (2018)
 Tokyo Vice (2022) as Ishida

Dubbing
 The Fast and the Furious (2005 TV Asahi edition) (Dominic Toretto (Vin Diesel))

References

External links
 
 

1955 births
Japanese male film actors
Living people
Actors from Yamanashi Prefecture
Kamen Rider